The following is a list of players of the now-defunct  1944–1954 Baltimore Bullets professional basketball team.

John Abramovic
Don Asmonga
Jim Baechtold
Don Barksdale
Leo Barnhorst
Mike Bloom
Bill Bolger
Don Boven
Darrell Brown
Walt Budko
Dick Bunt
Tommy Byrnes
Bill Calhoun
Don Carlson
Paul Cloyd
Ray Corley
Blaine Denning
Joe Dolhon
Johnny Ezersky
George Feigenbaum
Ray Felix
Jim Fritsche
Herm Fuetsch
Elmer Gainer
Paul Gordon
Chick Halbert
Alex Hannum
Rollen Hans
Billy Hassett
Don Henriksen
Kleggie Hermsen
Paul Hoffman
Doug Holcomb
Bob Houbregs
Gene James
Howie Janotta
Buddy Jeannette
Johnny Jorgensen
George Kaftan
Jack Kerris
Dan King
Herman Klotz
Lee Knorek
Dan Kraus
Herb Krautblatt
Frank Kudelka
Robert Latshaw
Freddie Lewis
Grady Lewis
Ron Livingstone
Jim Luisi
Ray Lumpp
Norm Mager
John Mahnken
Mo Mahoney
John Mandic
Don Martin
Mike McCarron
Alfred McGuire
George McLeod
Chet McNabb
Joe McNamee
Dick Mehen
Carl Meinhold
Stan Miasek
Eddie Miller
Dave Minor
Leo Mogus
Ken Murray
Jim Neal
Paul Nolen
Ralph O'Brien
Andy O'Donnell
Tommy O'Keefe
Kevin O'Shea
Don Otten
Red Owens
Jake Pelkington
Bob Peterson
Bob Priddy
Les Pugh
Howie Rader
Ray Ramsey
George Ratkovicz
Connie Rea
Don Rehfeldt
Chick Reiser
Red Rocha
Al Roges
Irv Rothenberg
Jerry Rullo
Ed Sadowski
Kenny Sailors
Pep Saul
Marv Schatzman
Dick Schulz
Fred Scolari
Frank Selvy
Paul Seymour
Connie Simmons
Jim Slaughter
Belus Smawley
Joe Smyth
Stan Stutz
Sid Tanenbaum
Hal Tidrick
Jack Toomay
Irv Torgoff
Bob Tough
Blackie Towery
Dick Triptow
Hal Uplinger
Whitey Von Nieda
Brady Walker
Mark Workman
Max Zaslofsky

References
Baltimore Bullets (1944–54) all-time roster @ basketball-reference.com

National Basketball Association all-time rosters

Baltimore-related lists